Mott Township is one of sixteen townships in Franklin County, Iowa, United States.  As of the 2010 census, its population was 498 and it contained 237 housing units.

History
Mott Township was organized in 1879.  The Mott family were prominent landowners.

Geography

Cemeteries
The township contains Trinity Cemetery.

Transportation
 Iowa Highway 3
 U.S. Route 65

School districts
 Hampton-Dumont Community School District

Political districts
 Iowa's 4th congressional district
 State House District 54
 State Senate District 27

References

External links
 City-Data.com

Townships in Iowa
Townships in Franklin County, Iowa
Populated places established in 1879
1879 establishments in Iowa